The Thunder Road Stakes is a Grade III American Thoroughbred horse race for horses age four and older, over a distance of 1 mile on the turf held annually in January at Santa Anita Park, Arcadia, California.  The event currently carries a purse of $100,000.

History 

The race was inaugurated on 11 February 2004 as a handicap and was won by Singletary who was ridden by US Hall of Fame jockey Victor Espinoza by a margin of one length in a time of 1:34.42.

The event was upgraded to a Grade III event for 2009 and was switched to the artificial main track because of weather conditions. 

The event was not run in 2010 or 2012.

It was downgraded to listed status for 2013 through 2015 but was upgraded back to a Grade III event in 2016. It is currently run under allowance weight conditions with a purse of $100,000.

Records
Speed  record:
 1:31.78 – Tom's Tribute (2014)

Margins:
  lengths – Hit the Road (2021)

Most wins:
 No horse has won this race more than once.

Most wins by an owner:
 No owner has won this race more than once.

Most wins by a jockey:
 3 – Victor Espinoza (2004, 2006, 2015)
 3 – Flavien Prat (2018, 2022, 2023)

Most wins by a trainer:
 3 – Phlip D'Amato (2017, 2022, 2023)

Winners 

Legend:

See also
List of American and Canadian Graded races

References

Graded stakes races in the United States
Grade 3 stakes races in the United States
Flat horse races for four-year-olds
Open mile category horse races
Horse races in California
Turf races in the United States
Recurring sporting events established in 2004
Santa Anita Park
2004 establishments in California